This article is a list of various nations' armed forces ranking designations.  Comparisons are made between the different systems used by nations to categorize the hierarchy of an armed force compared to another. Several of these lists mention NATO reference codes. These are the NATO rank reference codes, used for easy comparison among NATO countries. Links to comparison charts can be found below.

References to modern military

Albania
Military ranks of Albania

Algeria
Algeria military ranks

Angola
Military ranks of Angola

Argentina
Military ranks of Argentina
Argentine Army officer rank insignia; Argentine Army enlisted rank insignia

Australia
Australian Defence Force ranks
Royal Australian Navy ranks and uniforms
Australian Army officer rank insignia; Australian Army other ranks insignia
Ranks of the RAAF

Austria
Ranks of the Austrian Bundesheer

Bahrain
Military ranks of Bahrain

Bangladesh
Ranks of Bangladesh Army
Ranks and insignia of Bangladesh Navy
Bangladesh Air Force rank insignia

Belarus 
Military ranks of Belarus

Belgium
Belgian military ranks

Bhutan
Military ranks of Bhutan

Bolivia
Military ranks of Bolivia

Bosnia and Herzegovina
Military ranks and insignia of Bosnia and Herzegovina

Botswana
Military ranks of Botswana

Brazil
Brazilian military ranks

Bulgaria 

 Military ranks of Bulgaria

Canada
Canadian Armed Forces ranks and insignia

Chile
Army ranks and insignia of Chile
Naval ranks and insignia of Chile
Air Force ranks and insignia of Chile

China 
 Ranks of the People's Liberation Army Ground Force 
 Ranks of the People's Liberation Army Navy 
 Ranks of the People's Liberation Army Air Force
 Ranks of the People's Armed Police

Colombia
Military ranks of the Colombian Armed Forces

Congo
Military ranks of the Democratic Republic of Congo

Congo-Brazzaville
Military ranks of Republic of the Congo

Croatia
Croatian military ranks

Cuba
Cuban military ranks

Czech Republic
Czech military ranks

Denmark
Danish Army ranks
Danish Navy ranks
Danish Air Force ranks

Egypt
Egyptian Air Force ranks
Egyptian Army ranks
Egyptian Navy ranks

Ecuador
Military ranks of Ecuador

Estonia
Military ranks of Estonia

Ethiopia
Military ranks of Ethiopia

Finland
Finnish military ranks

France
French Army ranks
French Navy ranks
French Air Force ranks
French Gendarmerie ranks

Gabon
Military ranks of the Armed Forces of Gabon

Georgia
Georgian military ranks

Germany
Rank insignia of the German Bundeswehr
Ranks of the German Bundeswehr

Greece
Greek military ranks
Hellenic Army: officer, other

Hungary
Hungarian military ranks

India
Indian Army ranks and insignia
Indian Navy ranks and insignia
Indian Air Force ranks and insignia

Indonesia
Indonesian military ranks

Iran
Rank insignia of the Iranian military

Iraq
Military ranks of Iraq

Ireland
Irish Defence Forces rank insignia

Israel
Israel Defense Forces ranks and insignia

Italy
Italian Army ranks
Italian Navy ranks
Italian Air Force ranks
Italian Carabinieri ranks

Japan
Japanese military ranks
Pre-1945 historical ranks:
Ranks of the Imperial Japanese Army
Ranks of the Imperial Japanese Navy

Jordan
Jordanian military ranks

Kenya
Military ranks of Kenya

Laos
Military ranks of the Lao People's Armed Forces

Lebanon
Military ranks of Lebanon

Lithuania
Lithuanian military ranks and insignia

Malaysia
Malaysian military ranks

Mexico
Army ranks and insignia of Mexico
Naval ranks and insignia of Mexico

Mongolia
Mongolian military ranks

Myanmar
• Military ranks of Myanmar

Nepal
Military ranks of Nepal

Netherlands
Dutch military ranks

New Zealand
New Zealand military ranks

Nicaragua
Nicaragua military ranks

North Korea
Military ranks of North Korea
Comparative military ranks of Korea

Norway
Norwegian military ranks

Pakistan
Pakistan Army ranks and insignia
Pakistan Navy ranks and insignia
Pakistan Air Force ranks and insignia

Peru
Peruvian Army (Ejército del Perú)
Peruvian Navy (Marina de Guerra del Perú)
Peruvian Air Force (Fuerza Aérea del Perú)

Philippines
Military ranks of the Philippines

Poland
Polish Armed Forces rank insignia

Portugal
Portuguese Armed Forces rank insignia

Romania
Romanian Army ranks and insignia

Roman Empire

 Imperial Roman legion's ranks

Russia
Russian Army ranks and insignia
Russian Navy ranks and insignia
Russian Air Force ranks and insignia

Saudi Arabia
Saudi Arabian military ranks

Serbia
Serbian military ranks and insignia

Singapore
Singapore Armed Forces ranks

Slovakia
Military ranks of Slovakia

Slovenia
Slovenian military ranks

Somalia
Military ranks of Somalia

Somaliland 

 Military ranks of Somaliland

South Africa
South African military ranks

South Korea
Military ranks of South Korea
Comparative military ranks of Korea

Spain
Military ranks of Spain

Sri Lanka
Sri Lanka Army rank insignia
Sri Lanka Navy rank insignia
Sri Lanka Air Force rank insignia

Sweden
Military ranks of the Swedish Armed Forces

Switzerland
Swiss Army ranks

Syria
Military ranks of Syria

Republic of China (Taiwan) 
 Republic of China Armed Forces rank insignia

Tajikistan
Military ranks of Tajikistan

Tanzania
Rank and insignia of the Tanzanian Armed Forces

Thailand
Military ranks of the Thai armed forces

Tunisia
Military ranks of Tunisia

Turkey
Military ranks of Turkey

Ukraine
Military ranks of Ukraine

United Arab Emirates
Military ranks of United Arab Emirates

United Kingdom
Royal Navy officer rank insignia; Royal Navy ratings rank insignia
British Army officer rank insignia; British Army other rank insignia
Royal Air Force officer ranks; Royal Air Force other ranks
United Kingdom and United States military ranks compared

United States
United States uniformed services: comparative ranks of officers, warrant officers, and enlisted servicemen
United States Air Force: enlisted, officer
United States Army: enlisted, warrant officer, officer
United States Coast Guard: enlisted, warrant officer, officer
United States Marine Corps: enlisted, warrant officer, officer
United States Navy: enlisted, warrant officer, officer
United States Public Health Service Commissioned Corps: officer
United States Space Force: enlisted, officer
National Oceanic and Atmospheric Administration Commissioned Officer Corps: officer
United Kingdom and United States military ranks compared

Venezuela
Venezuelan military ranks

Vietnam
Vietnamese military ranks and insignia

Zambia
Military ranks of Zambia

Zimbabwe
Military ranks of Zimbabwe

Continental comparisons

Africa
 Comparative army officer ranks of Africa
 Comparative army enlisted ranks of Africa
 Comparative air force officer ranks of Africa
 Comparative air force enlisted ranks of Africa
 Comparative navy officer ranks of Africa
 Comparative navy enlisted ranks of Africa

Americas
 Comparative army officer ranks of the Americas
 Comparative army enlisted ranks of the Americas
 Comparative air force officer ranks of the Americas
 Comparative air force enlisted ranks of the Americas
 Comparative navy officer ranks of the Americas
 Comparative navy enlisted ranks of the Americas

Asia
 Comparative army officer ranks of Asia
 Comparative army enlisted ranks of Asia
 Comparative air force officer ranks of Asia
 Comparative air force enlisted ranks of Asia
 Comparative navy officer ranks of Asia
 Comparative navy enlisted ranks of Asia

Europe
 Comparative army officer ranks of Europe
 Comparative army enlisted ranks of Europe
 Comparative air force officer ranks of Europe
 Comparative air force enlisted ranks of Europe
 Comparative navy officer ranks of Europe
 Comparative navy enlisted ranks of Europe

Oceania
 Comparative army officer ranks of Oceania
 Comparative army enlisted ranks of Oceania
 Comparative air force officer ranks of Oceania
 Comparative air force enlisted ranks of Oceania
 Comparative navy officer ranks of Oceania
 Comparative navy enlisted ranks of Oceania

Other comparisons

NATO
Ranks and insignia of NATO
Ranks and insignia of NATO armies officers
Ranks and insignia of NATO armies enlisted
Ranks and insignia of NATO Air Forces Officers
Ranks and insignia of NATO Air Forces Enlisted
Ranks and insignia of officers of NATO navies
Ranks and insignia of NATO Navies Enlisted

Commonwealth of Nations
 Comparative army officer ranks of the Commonwealth
 Comparative army enlisted ranks of the Commonwealth
 Comparative air force officer ranks of the Commonwealth
 Comparative air force enlisted ranks of the Commonwealth
 Comparative navy officer ranks of the Commonwealth
 Comparative navy enlisted ranks of the Commonwealth

Previous eras

Miscellaneous
Royal Navy during the 18th and 19th centuries
United States (Union) Army during the civil war
United States (Union) Navy during the civil war
Confederate Army during the civil war
Confederate Navy during the civil war
Rank insignia of the Austro-Hungarian armed forces
Ranks in the Austro-Hungarian Navy
South Vietnamese military ranks and insignia

First and Second World War comparisons
Comparative military ranks of World War I
Comparative officer ranks of World War II
World War II German Army ranks and insignia
Military ranks of the Luftwaffe (1935–45)
Corps colours of the Luftwaffe (1935–45)
Uniforms and insignia of the Kriegsmarine
 Japan - army ranks of the Japanese Empire during World War II
 Japan - naval ranks of the Japanese Empire during World War II
 United States Army enlisted rank insignia of World War I
 United States Army enlisted rank insignia of World War II

.
 01
Comparative military ranks
.Ranks
Ranks